The 67th District of the Iowa House of Representatives in the state of Iowa.

Current elected officials
Eric Gjerde is the representative currently representing the district.

Past representatives
The district has previously been represented by:
 Norman Roorda, 1971–1973
 James T. Caffrey, 1973–1977
 Ned Chiodo, 1977–1983
 James J. Cooper, 1983–1989
 Joel W. Brown, 1989–1993
 Matt McCoy, 1993–1997
 Frank Chiodo, 1997–2003
 Kevin McCarthy, 2003–2013
 Kraig Paulsen, 2013–2017
 Ashley Hinson, 2017–2021
 Eric Gjerde, 2021–present

References

067